S. floribunda may refer to:

 Scaevola floribunda, a plant endemic to Fiji
 Scaphyglottis floribunda, a New World orchid
 Scrophularia floribunda, a herbaceous plant
 Soyauxia floribunda, an African plant
 Stephanotis floribunda, a plant native to Madagascar
 Styphelia floribunda, an Oceanian heather
 Sutera floribunda, a herbaceous plant
 Swartzia floribunda, a tropical legume
 Swintonia floribunda, a drupe-bearing plant
 Synaphea floribunda, a plant endemic to Western Australia